The 2012 Summer Olympics, officially known as the Games of the XXX Olympiad, were held in London, United Kingdom, from 25 July 2012 to 12 August 2012.

Approximately 10,500 athletes participated in 302 events in 26 sports. Athletes from the United States won the most gold medals, with 46, and the most overall, with 103. Michael Phelps and Missy Franklin won the most gold medals at the games with four each. Phelps also won the greatest number of medals overall winning six in total. Bahrain, Botswana, Cyprus, Gabon, Grenada, Guatemala and Montenegro each won their first Olympic medal ever, with Grenada's being gold.
 
{| id="toc" class="toc" summary="Contents"
|-
| style="text-align:center;" colspan=3|Contents
|-
|
Archery
Athletics
Badminton
Basketball
Boxing
Canoeing
Cycling
Diving
Equestrian
Fencing
|valign=top|
Field hockey
Football
Gymnastics
Handball
Judo
Modern pentathlon
Rowing
Sailing
Shooting
Swimming
|valign=top|
Synchronized swimming
Table tennis
Taekwondo
Tennis
Triathlon
Volleyball
Water polo
Weightlifting
Wrestling
|-
| style="text-align:center;" colspan="3"|       References       External links
|}


Archery

Athletics

Men's events

Women's events

 *Indicates the athlete only competed in the preliminary heats.
 The original winner, Nadzeya Ostapchuk of Belarus, was stripped of her gold medal after failing drugs tests. The rest of the competitors were elevated by one position accordingly.
 The original silver medalist, Darya Pishchalnikova of Russia, was stripped of her silver medal after failing drugs tests. The rest of the competitors were elevated by one position accordingly.
 The original winner, Tatyana Lysenko of Russia, was stripped of her gold medal after failing drugs tests. The rest of the competitors were elevated by one position accordingly.

Badminton

Basketball

Boxing

Canoeing

Slalom

Flatwater

Cycling

Road cycling

Track cycling

Men's

Women's

Mountain biking

BMX

Diving

Men's events

Women's events

Equestrian

Fencing

Men's events

Women's events

Field hockey

Football

Gymnastics

Artistic

Men's events

Women's events

Rhythmic

Trampoline

Handball

Judo

Men's events

Women's events

Modern pentathlon

Rowing

Men's events

Women's events

Sailing

Shooting

Men's events

Women's events

Swimming

Men's events

Women's events

Synchronized swimming

Table tennis

Taekwondo

Men's

Women's

Tennis

Triathlon

Volleyball

Water polo

Weightlifting

Men's events

Women's events

Wrestling

Freestyle

Greco-Roman

See also
 2012 Summer Olympics medal table

References

External links

Official website
Medal winners

Lists of Summer Olympic medalists by year
London sport-related lists